The Utah Children's Justice Center (CJC) is a program of the Utah Attorney General's Office to coordinate investigation and prosecution of child abuse, especially child sexual abuse.  There are 22 CJC's in the state of Utah.  They were created to provide a child friendly environment for interviews and exams of child victims as well as to provide support and centralized resource referrals to victim's families. In 2021, Joy D. Jones presented a $300,000 gift from the Church of Jesus Christ of Latter-day Saints (LDS Church) to assist their 26 centers throughout the state.

Services
Prior to the creation of the Utah CJC's, investigation of child abuse may have required a child victim to be interviewed by police, social services, medical personnel, psychologists and prosecutors. The primary function of the CJC is to provide a facility where children can feel more comfortable and receive coordinated services as part of the investigative process.  The interviews are completed in a home-like setting by law enforcement and/or social service investigators.  The interview is recorded so representatives from all involved agencies are able to use the interview in their investigation.

The children's justice center provides many secondary services.  These include:
Medical forensic exams on-site at some centers
Tracking and monitoring of cases through the criminal justice system
Collaboration of resources among agencies involved in the investigation
Community education presentations
Referrals for mental health and other services

Locations
Utah has 26 justice centers where child victims can be interviewed in a safe child-friendly environment. The centers help coordinate investigation and prosecution of child sex abuse cases. They also provide referral services to victims' families.

Cache County CJC
Salt Lake South Valley CJC
Carbon County CJC
Tooele County CJC
Davis County CJC
Uintah/Daggett County CJC
Duchesne County CJC
Utah County CJC
Emery County CJC
Summit County CJC
Grand County CJC
Washington County CJC
Iron County CJC
Weber/Morgan County CJC
Salt Lake Avenues CJC
Box Elder County CJC
San Juan County CJC
Sanpete County CJC
Sevier County CJC
Wasatch County CJC
Kane County CJC
Beaver County CJC

Notes

External links
 Children's Justice Centers, at AttorneyGeneral.Utah.gov
 Iron County Children's Justice Center
 Utah County Children's Justice Center
 Weber/Morgan Counties Children's Justice Center

Child abuse-related organizations
Criminal investigation
Organizations based in Utah
Public services